Sanjoy Nag (born 18 March) is a film director/actor. He won the National Film Award in 2011 for his debut feature film Memories in March.

Early life and background
Sanjoy Nag was born and brought up in Kolkata. He completed his schooling from St James’ School. He pursued commerce from University of Calcutta. He was associated with the film and television industry of Bengal from a young age.

Career
He conceptualized the album Priyo Bondhu with Anjan Dutt and Nima Rahman. In 2011, he made his debut feature film Memories in March that won him the National Film Award for Best Feature Film in English. He acted in Rituparno Ghosh’s film on Rabindranath Tagore.He was associate director for Rituporno Ghosh's award winning film Chitrangada and Anjan Dutt's film Badadin

Filmography as director

Filmography as actor

References 

 ,  Hindustan Times  25 December 2017

 , Indian Express 24 December 2107

 , The New Indian Express9 September 2108

 , The Statesman9 September 2018

 , Mid-day4 September 2018

 , Deccan Chronicle9 September 2018

External links

Interviews
 Director of the film "Memories in March", Sanjoy Nag addressing a press conference at IFFI-2011, YouTube, 42ndIFFI2011 27 November 2011
 Video of Interview, YouTube, BollywoodHungama.com 31 March 2011

Film directors from Kolkata
Living people
1967 births
Bengali film directors